Neyles (also Neyles Cross Roads) is an unincorporated community in Colleton County, South Carolina, United States. It is located along South Carolina Highway 64 southeast of Walterboro, and northeast of Ritter.

The Ravenwood Plantation is located near Neyles.

Notes

Unincorporated communities in Colleton County, South Carolina
Unincorporated communities in South Carolina